On October 17, 1822, Ludwig Worman (F) of  died in office.  A special election was held to fill the resulting vacancy on December 10, 1822

Election results

Udree took his seat on December 23, 1822.

See also
List of special elections to the United States House of Representatives

References

Pennsylvania 1822 07
Pennsylvania 1822 07
1822 07
Pennsylvania 07
United States House of Representatives 07
United States House of Representatives 1822 07